The rete testis is an anastomosing network of delicate tubules located in the hilum of the testicle (mediastinum testis) that carries sperm from the seminiferous tubules to the efferent ducts. It is the counterpart of the rete ovarii in females. Its function is to provide a site for fluid reabsorption.

Structure

The rete testis is the network of interconnecting tubules where the straight seminiferous tubules (the terminal part of the seminiferous tubules) empty. It is located within a highly vascular connective tissue in the mediastinum testis. The epithelial cells form a single layer that lines the inner surface of the tubules. These cells are cuboidal, with microvilli and a single cilium on their surface.

Development
In the development of the urinary and reproductive organs, the testis is developed in much the same way as the ovary, originating from mesothelium as well as mesonephros. Like the ovary, in its earliest stages it consists of a central mass covered by a surface epithelium. In the central mass, a series of cords appear. These cords run together toward the future hilum and form a network that ultimately becomes the rete testis.

Function
It appears the function of the rete testis is to mix the sperm as they leave the seminiferous tubules. Sperm leave the seminiferous tubules in the dilute secretions of Sertoli cells. The rete testis does modify the luminal fluids with a limited amount of secretion and reabsorption, but their primary function is to mix and transport the sperm into the efferent ductules, where the major function is reabsorption of about 95% of the fluid, which increases the sperm concentration prior to entering the epididymis.

Clinical significance
Rete tubular ectasia is a disorder of the rete testis characterized by multiple benign cysts.

Etymology
English uses the New Latin name for the structure, which simply means "network of the testis".

Additional images

References

External links
 Image at UC Davis 
 Diagram 
 Diagram

Scrotum